"Dead Things" is the 13th episode of season 6 of the television series Buffy the Vampire Slayer. It originally appeared on February 5, 2002. The episode was directed by James A. Contner and written by Steven S. DeKnight.

Plot
After having sex on the floor of Spike's crypt, Buffy and Spike discuss her feelings for him; she acknowledges "sometimes" liking him at best, but "never" fully trusting him. Later, Buffy talks privately with Tara about the fact that Spike can now hurt her despite his chip continuing to function; she fears Willow's spell brought her back "wrong", and Tara agrees to research the possibility. That evening, Xander and Anya teach Dawn to waltz, in preparation for the wedding. Dawn leaves to stay with her friend Janice, not having anticipated Buffy's uncharacteristic desire to spend the evening with her, so Buffy joins the others at the Bronze. There, Buffy and Willow discuss the latter's recovery, having not used magic in a month. Willow then joins Xander and Anya on the dance floor while Buffy wanders to the balcony. Spike joins her there and they have sex while he forces her to watch her friends dance; he encourages her to think of her life with him as separate from theirs.

Meanwhile, the Trio create a "cerebral dampener", which can turn any woman into their sex slave. Warren browses a bar for attractive women while Andrew and Jonathan watch through a camera in Warren's tie, pointing out various women they would like to have as slaves. Irritated by the suggestions, Warren removes his earpiece and approaches someone familiar: his ex-girlfriend, Katrina. Katrina rejects Warren, but he uses the dampener on her and she addresses him as "Master". The trio bring her to the house they have rented since fleeing their lair, and dress her as a maid. After she serves them champagne, Warren brings her to a bedroom for sex, but the dampener's control fades. Enraged, she accuses the Trio of planning to rape her, shocking Jonathan and Andrew, who are also disturbed to learn that she is Warren's ex-girlfriend. Katrina declares she will go to the police; to stop her from leaving, Warren hits her in the head with the champagne bottle, accidentally killing her.

That night, Buffy goes to Spike's crypt but leaves before he comes to the door. On patrol, she follows a woman's screams and is attacked by demons. The timeline of the fight seemingly flows out of order. Spike attacks the demons, while a disoriented Buffy accidentally strikes the female victim, apparently causing her to fall to her death; the woman was actually Jonathan magically disguised as Katrina, whom Buffy did not recognize, and the Trio then planted Katrina's real corpse at the scene. Spike pulls a distraught Buffy away from the scene and tries to dispose of the body. After experiencing a disturbing dream about Spike and Katrina, Buffy tells Dawn that she has to go the police over her involvement in a woman's death; assuming Buffy will be taken away from her as a result, Dawn accuses Buffy of being emotionally absent and actively looking for a way to be separated from her.

Outside the police station, Spike tries to prevent Buffy from turning herself in, only for them to overhear that the body washed up by the river. Spike tells Buffy that, having saved thousands of lives, she should not have to pay for accidentally taking one. As Spike attempts to physically restrain her, Buffy takes out her frustration and anger on Spike; he stops defending himself and encourages her to attack him. She beats him senseless, calling him evil and soulless. Appalled by what she has just done, Buffy walks dazedly away from Spike. She enters the police station and overhears that the girl in the woods was Katrina Silber, whom she now recognizes as Warren's ex-girlfriend. Immediately guessing the truth, Buffy leaves without discussing the incident with the police. The Scooby Gang research and find that the demons Buffy encountered in the woods caused the time shifting, concluding that Katrina was dead before Buffy even encountered her. Buffy is certain of Warren's involvement and wants The Trio found and dealt with. The Sunnydale Police rule Katrina's death to be suicide or accidental drowning; Andrew is enthused by Warren's pronouncement that they got away with murder, while Jonathan seems disturbed.

After researching the resurrection spell, Tara tells Buffy that the spell changed Buffy on a molecular level, just enough to confuse Spike's chip, but did not make her in any way "wrong". Buffy is distraught, because she felt this was the only way to explain her recent behavior, admitting that she and Spike are having sex. Though surprised, Tara is supportive and says that it is okay whether Buffy loves Spike or not because Spike loves her. Buffy says that her not loving Spike but only "using" him disgusts her as much as actually loving him. Buffy breaks down crying with her head in Tara's lap, begging to know what is "wrong" with her.

References

External links

 

Buffy the Vampire Slayer (season 6) episodes
2002 American television episodes
Television episodes about murder
Television episodes about violence against women